Ire Works is the third studio album by American band the Dillinger Escape Plan. The album was released in the UK on November 5, 2007, in the US on November 13 through Relapse Records, and in Japan on November 28. The album was their last album on Relapse. The album is Gil Sharone's first and last album with the band and their first without founding drummer Chris Pennie. Lead guitarist Ben Weinman plays guitar alone on the record, due to Brian Benoit's injury. The album is described as mathcore, post-hardcore, and metalcore, incorporating a wide variety of influences including electronic music.

According to an interview in Terrorizer magazine, this is their last album on the Relapse Records label. The album was critically successful, debuting on the Billboard 200 at number 142 with 7,000 copies scanned, but was later corrected when it was revealed that Relapse somehow forgot to scan the pre-release album sales, which made the first week total actually around 11,000. The album features guest vocals by band's former vocalist Dimitri Minakakis (on "Fix Your Face") and Mastodon's Brent Hinds (on "Horse Hunter").

Background
After a successful reception and tour to Miss Machine, the band began recording new material. However, drummer Chris Pennie left the band to join Coheed and Cambria as the band's permanent drummer after the departure of their former drummer. Shortly after, new drummer Gil Sharone was hired by Dillinger and performed the drum tracks on the album.

During the Miss Machine tours, guitarist Brian Benoit developed nerve damage in his left hand and was forced to quit the band. Instead of hiring a new guitarist, Ben Weinman played all of the album's guitar tracks. Jeff Tuttle was later hired as the band's touring guitarist. Once again, the band hired metalcore producer Steve Evetts. Former vocalist Dimitri Minakakis makes guest vocals on the track "Fix Your Face", and has appeared on stage with the band many times.

The artwork was created by Shelby Cinca of Frodus and Decahedron. He was chosen by the band for his sci-fi/futurist-influenced visual sensibilities. The artwork is also a subtle reference to Bloom's Taxonomy of Learning, as a URL pointing to "ireworks.net" is written in small, almost hidden text on the album's official lyric sheet. The triangle on the album contains the same basic colors shown on the Bloom's Taxonomy of Learning pyramid, though the actual artwork uses gradients versus having different levels of shading.

Critical reception

Ire Works was released to critical acclaim. In the January 2008 issue of Revolver they counted down the top 20 albums of 2007 with Ire Works at number two, right behind Baroness's Red Album and before High on Fire's Death Is This Communion. It gained the same spot in Kerrang! magazine's Top 20 albums of 2007, before Machine Head's The Blackening and behind Biffy Clyro's Puzzle. It was ranked number 3, below Watain's Sworn to the Dark and Pig Destroyer's Phantom Limb, in Decibel's Top 40 Albums of 2007.
Mike Portnoy named this album one of his favorite albums of 2007 on his official web page.

Track listing

The live version of "The Perfect Design" previously appeared on the Plagiarism EP.

Personnel
 Greg Puciato – lead vocals
 Ben Weinman – guitars, piano, programming, sound design, backing vocals
 Liam Wilson – bass
 Gil Sharone – drums, percussion

Additional personnel
 Dimitri Minakakis – backing vocals on "Fix Your Face"
 Brent Hinds – backing vocals on "Horse Hunter"
 Steve Evetts – producer
 Steve Ryan – additional/assistant engineering
 Alan Douches – mastering
 Shelby Cinca – graphic design
 Craig Demel – violin
 Robin Reynolds – cello
 Phill Williams – percussion
 Ali Tabatabai – percussion, saw
 Matt Lupo – trumpet on "Milk Lizard"

Charts

References

The Dillinger Escape Plan albums
2007 albums
Relapse Records albums
Albums produced by Steve Evetts